Mansonville Airport  is located at Mansonville, Quebec, Canada.

References

Registered aerodromes in Estrie